New City is the eighth album by the band Blood, Sweat & Tears, released by Columbia Records in April 1975. It peaked at Number 47 on the Billboard Pop Albums charts.

New City marks the return to the line-up of lead vocalist David Clayton-Thomas.

Reception

Writing for Allmusic, critic Jason Elias wrote the album "It does sound promising, but, in all honesty, New City's fortunes seemed doomed from the start."

Release history
In addition to the conventional two channel stereo version the album was also released by Columbia in a four channel quadraphonic edition on LP record and 8-track tape in 1975. The quad LP release was encoded in the SQ matrix system.

New City was reissued in the UK on the Super Audio CD format in 2019 by Dutton Vocalion. This release is a two albums on one disc compilation which also contains the 1974 Blood Sweat & Tears album Mirror Image. The Dutton Vocalion disc contains the complete stereo and quad versions of both albums.

Track listing
"Ride Captain Ride" (Skip Konte, Franke Konte, Mike Pinera, Carlos Pinera) – 5:06
"Life" (Allen Toussaint) – 4:24
"No Show" (Ron McClure) – 5:15
"I Was a Witness to a War" (Danny Meehan, Bobby Scott) – 5:13
"One Room Country Shack" (John Lee Hooker, Traditional) – 2:24
"Applause" (Janis Ian) – 7:47
"Yesterday's Music" (Clayton-Thomas, William Smith) – 4:14
"Naked Man" (Randy Newman) – 4:00
"Got to Get You into My Life" (John Lennon, Paul McCartney) – 3:22
"Takin' It Home" (Bobby Colomby) – 1:37

Personnel
David Clayton-Thomas – vocals
Dave Bargeron – trombone, tuba, baritone horn, bass trumpet
Bobby Colomby – drums, percussion, background vocals
Joe Giorgianni – trumpet, flugelhorn, piccolo trumpet
Tony Klatka – trumpet, flugelhorn, piccolo trumpet
Ron McClure – bass
Bill Tillman – saxophone, background vocals
Georg Wadenius – guitar, background vocals
Larry Willis – keyboards
Mike Corbett – background vocals
Production notes
Jimmy Ienner – producer
Greg Calbi – engineer
Tom Dwyer – assistant
Rod O'Brien – assistant engineer
Carmine Rubino – engineer
Shelly Yakus – engineer

Charts
Album - Billboard (United States)

References

Blood, Sweat & Tears albums
1975 albums
Albums produced by Jimmy Ienner
Columbia Records albums